The Glass House is an American reality game show that premiered on June 18, 2012, on ABC, and aired for one season. Fourteen contestants live in the house and compete for $250,000. Voting by viewers helped decide which contestants got sent home.

Main series
The first season of the show originally began in June 2012. The show was met with criticism and low ratings, though its critical reception improved over time. Following the performance of the first season, a second season was seen as doubtful. Producer Steve Booth hinted that a second season was possible, posting on his official Twitter: "No word on a Season 2 yet. But rumor has it... Probably won't know for sure until next spring". Executive producer Kenny Rosen also stated that a change of format may be in the works, and hinted at the possibility of the most neutral players being the Team Captains, as to keep the big personalities in the game for a while. The show was officially cancelled by ABC producers on May 29, 2013, almost a year after the show premiered.

Format
The Glass House featured 14 strangers living in a house made of glass, with cameras recording their every move. At selected days and times, viewers can watch a live feed into the house. There are weekly eliminations, in which the public decides which of the contestants are eliminated from the game. Aside from choosing who is eliminated, viewers also dictate what the contestants wear, where they sleep and what they eat. While in the house, the contestants will split into two groups and compete in various physical and mental competitions. The captains of the two teams are the two contestants who have received the fewest votes from the public. After losing a challenge, the captain of the losing team is sent to limbo, along with a second member of that team which is voted on by the house. While in limbo, the public will vote which of the two contestants deserves to go back into the house and which one should permanently be eliminated from the game. The contestant with the fewest votes is eliminated, while the other will return to the house. The contestants are spoken to by a robotic female voice, which they referred to as the "Oracle" up until Day 3, when it was revealed the public would decide the voice's name. After the airing of the first live feed, online blogs and forums labeled the voice "FaRi", a portmanteau of the words faux and Siri, the personal assistant found on Apple's iPhone.

Weekly episodes and live feeds
The show premiered on Monday, June 18 at 10p.m. ET/PT on ABC in the United States. The first season of The Glass House featured ten episodes, which aired Mondays at 10p.m. The airing episode showed highlights of the previous week, and featured the nomination and eviction process. Aside from the weekly episode, viewers can watch a live feed into the house at various days and times. On Mondays, the feeds were viewable from 11p.m. to 3a.m. the following day. Tuesday and Wednesday, the feeds would be viewed from 3p.m. to 4p.m. and 9p.m. to 12a.m. Thursday the feeds would be viewed from 3p.m. to 4p.m.

Season details

America's vote
Besides choosing whom to eliminate from the game, viewers were given several options that affected the game. A pre-season poll allowed voters to choose where contestants sleep, their food for the first night, and how the first competition was split up. A "favorite player" poll was posted on the website, in which viewers could select as many contestants as they want and choose them as their favorite. During the live feeds, viewers asked several questions which they will answer live. On the first live feed episode contestants had to guess how the majority of viewers answered the questions, but the following day the public were allowed to choose what the contestants did during the live feed. In a similar fashion, the viewers also chose what rooms the contestants slept in and could even influence their every day life such as forcing them to talk with a British accent for 24 hours or walking backwards for 24 hours.

Competitions
Weekly, players will split into two teams and compete to stay in the game. The competitions will vary from physical to mental, and will result in two members of the losing team being sent to limbo. Aside from these competitions, the group also performs various tasks during the live feeds, and have played games such as "Guess the Sketch", and a game which required them to figure out how the majority of viewers answered questions. The final competition of the first season featured the Final Four competing for individual immunity, with the challenge winner earning a spot in the Final Three.

Viewership

CBS lawsuit

On May 4, 2012, CBS issued a letter to ABC threatening legal action over The Glass House, as the format had strong similarities to its own series Big Brother, and that its production staff contained at least 18 members who had previously worked on Big Brother and were "privy to trade secrets and other confidential, proprietary information and signed broad and binding nondisclosure agreements" in relation to the format. On May 10, 2012, CBS went forward with a lawsuit against ABC, and sought a restraining order to halt the series' premiere.

Gary Allen Feess of the District Court for the Central District of California declined the request, arguing that it would unduly harm ABC's investment in producing the series, that elements of the format CBS claimed to be infringing were "generic" and not inherently novel, that production techniques were not considered intellectual property, and many of the claimed production techniques were actually common industry practices.

On August 17, 2012, CBS dismissed its lawsuit against ABC, citing the series' poor ratings. However, the network continued to pursue arbitration cases against several executives for their misappropriation of intellectual property related to the Big Brother format. In August 2013, CBS reached a settlement with ABC.

References

External links 
 
 

2010s American reality television series
2012 American television series debuts
2012 American television series endings
American Broadcasting Company original programming
2010s American game shows
English-language television shows
Television series by Disney–ABC Domestic Television